The 2015–16 Memphis Tigers men's basketball team represented the University of Memphis in the 2015–16 NCAA Division I men's basketball season, the 95th season of Tiger basketball. The Tigers, led by seventh year head coach Josh Pastner, played their home games at the FedExForum. The season marked the third season the Tigers have participated in the American Athletic Conference. The Tigers finished with a record of 19–15, 8–10 in AAC play to finish in seventh place in conference. The Tigers defeated Tulsa and Tulane in the AAC tournament before losing to UConn in the championship. For the second consecutive year, the Tigers did not participate in a postseason tournament.

Previous season
The Tigers finished the 2014–15 season with a record of 18–14 and 10–8 in AAC play to finish in a tie for fifth place in conference. The Tigers lost in the quarterfinals of the AAC tournament to Temple. The Tigers did not participate in a postseason tournament, marking the first time in 15 years that the Tigers had missed the postseason entirely.

Off-season

Departures

Transfers

Recruiting

Roster

Season Summary

On July 7, 2015, rising junior Austin Nichols announced his intention to transfer from Memphis.  Nichols, who the leading scorer and rebounder for the Tigers in 2014-15, was expected to lead the team in 2015-16 and was considered a likely first team all AAC player.  Memphis initially denied Nichols' transfer request before later providing a release with restrictions.  Nichols' attorney made a public statement after the restrictions were made public calling the restrictions a "calculated effort by a dysfunctional staff to punish a player for taking a step to remove himself from a failing program."  Nichols' announcement followed the departure of 5 other scholarship players to transfer since August 2014, including Dominic Woodson, Dominic Magee, Kuran Iverson, Nick King, and Pookie Powell. It also left Markel Crawford as the only remaining scholarship player from the Tigers' heralded 2013 recruiting class.  The restrictions on Nichols' release were swiftly removed by Memphis Athletic Director Tom Bowen, and Nichols ultimately transferred to the University of Virginia (a team originally on the restricted list).

On December 2, 2015, Coach Pastner informed media that freshman guard Raquan Mitchell, who had not logged a minute of floor time with the Tigers, would be transferring at the end of the semester.

In January, guard Sam Craft joined the basketball team. Craft, a running back and wide receiver for the Memphis football team, had been forbidden from playing basketball by former Memphis football coach Justin Fuente. However, new football coach Mike Norvell lifted the restriction and permitted Craft to play basketball.

After a home loss to AAC last place team East Carolina in January, Memphis newspaper columnist Geoff Calkins declared the Josh Pastner era "over" in Memphis.  The Tigers suffered a 20-point home loss to UConn on February 4, 2016, which marked the worst home loss for the Tigers since February 1999.

During the season, attendance at the FedEx Forum for Tigers' games dropped significantly from prior years. The Commercial Appeal discovered via a FOIA request that the actual turnstile attendance at Tiger games had fallen below 6,000 by mid February. The Tigers had previously not announced turnstile attendance figures but rather used tickets sold as official attendance numbers. The turnstile attendance became an issue of interest in the City of Memphis for the Tigers' last three home games of the year because the Tigers' facility usage agreement with the Memphis Grizzlies specified that the Tigers receive an annual payment from the NBA franchise if their turnstile attendance averaged over 6,000 for the year. The Tigers ultimately did achieve an average turnstile attendance figure above 6,000 for the year.

Upon losing to Temple on March 3, the Tigers clinched a losing record in conference for the first time in 16 years. The Tigers were a six seed in the AAC tournament, but they defeated each of their first two tournament opponents (3 seed Tulsa and 10 seed Tulane) by at least 20 points. The Tigers faced 5 seed UConn in the AAC Tournament championship but were soundly defeated.

Head coach Josh Pastner left Memphis to take the head coaching job at Georgia Tech on April 8, 2016.

Schedule

|-
!colspan=9 style=""| Exhibition

|-
!colspan=9 style=""| Regular season

|-
!colspan=9 style=""| American Athletic Conference tournament

Rankings

The Tigers were not ranked and did not receive any top 25 votes in either major poll during the 2015-16 season.

References

Memphis
Memphis Tigers men's basketball seasons
Memphis
Memphis